Eriogonum cinereum is a species of wild buckwheat known by the common names coastal buckwheat and ashyleaf buckwheat.

Distribution
This shrub is endemic to the coastline of Southern California, primarily within Los Angeles County and Ventura County.

It grows on beaches in coastal strand habitats and on bluffs and lower slopes of the Western Transverse Ranges, including the Santa Monica Mountains, in chaparral coastal sage scrub habitats below .

Description
It is light silvery gray in color due to the woolly hairs on its stems and foliage. The leaves are wavy-edged ovals one to three centimeters long.

The inflorescences stick out from the plant, each with one to several flower cluster heads of tiny tightly-packed frilly flowers which are usually light whitish-pink to brownish-pink in color, and quite hairy.

Uses
This is the foodplant for Euphilotes bernardino, the Bernardino dotted blue butterfly. Buckwheats (Eriogonum sp.) are very important for various butterflies and native wasps.

Cultivation
Eriogonum cinereum is cultivated as an ornamental plant, for planting in native plant, drought tolerant, and butterfly gardens and other wildlife gardens, and for larger designed natural landscaping and habitat restoration projects.

References

External links
 
 Calflora Database: Eriogonum cinereum (Ashyleaf buckwheat,  Coastal wild buckwheat, Grey coast eriogonum)
Jepson Manual eFlora (TJM2) treatment of Eriogonum cinereum
UC Photos gallery of Eriogonum cinereum

cinereum
Endemic flora of California
Natural history of the California chaparral and woodlands
Natural history of the Santa Monica Mountains
Natural history of the Transverse Ranges
Natural history of Los Angeles County, California
Natural history of Ventura County, California
Taxa named by George Bentham
Garden plants of North America
Butterfly food plants
Drought-tolerant plants